Brocchinia pustulosa is a species of sea snail, a marine gastropod mollusk in the family Cancellariidae, the nutmeg snails.

Description

Distribution
This marine species occurs off Southeast Brazil.

References

 Verhecken, A., 1991. Description of two new species of bathyal Cancellariidae (Mollusca, Gastropoda) from off Brazil. Bulletin du Muséum national d'Histoire naturelle 12(3-4)("1990"): 547-553

External links
 MNHN, Paris: holotype

Cancellariidae
Gastropods described in 1991